Copelatus subdeficiens is a species of diving beetle. It is part of the subfamily Copelatinae in the family Dytiscidae. It was described by Régimbart in 1902.

References

subdeficiens
Beetles described in 1902